Art Blakey in Sweden is a live album by drummer Art Blakey and the Jazz Messengers recorded in Stockholm in 1981 and released on the Amigo label.

Reception

Ron Wynn of AllMusic stated: "While there are times when the three-horn frontline does not sound completely together during ensemble sections, they mesh by the song's end."

Track listing 
 "Webb City" (Bud Powell) - 12:20  
 "How Deep Is the Ocean?" (Irving Berlin) - 10:07  
 "Skylark" (Hoagy Carmichael, Johnny Mercer) - 8:56  
 "Gypsy Folk Tales" (Walter Davis, Jr.) - 12:24

Personnel 
Art Blakey - drums
Wynton Marsalis - trumpet
Bobby Watson - alto saxophone
Bill Pierce - tenor saxophone
James Williams - piano
Charles Fambrough - bass

References 

1981 live albums
Art Blakey live albums
The Jazz Messengers live albums